Szonja Hozmann  (born 27 April 2001) is a Hungarian alpine skier.
She competed in slalom and giant slalom at the 2018 Winter Olympics.

References

2001 births
Living people
Hungarian female alpine skiers 
Olympic alpine skiers of Hungary 
Alpine skiers at the 2018 Winter Olympics
Competitors at the 2023 Winter World University Games
21st-century Hungarian women